Gandugali Rama is a 1983 Indian Kannada-language film, directed by H. R. Bhargava and produced by Smt Lakshmi Venkatesh. The film stars Vishnuvardhan, Madhavi, Jayamalini and M. P. Shankar. The film has musical score by Chellapilla Satyam.

Cast

Vishnuvardhan
Madhavi
Jayamalini
M. P. Shankar
T. M. Venkatesh
Sundar Krishna Urs
Sudheer
N. S. Rao
Thyagaraja Urs
Rajanand
Ramadas
Rajanagesh
Gode Lakshminarayan
Jr. Narasimharaju
Thimma
Negro Johnny
Master Naveen
Kaminidharan
Ashalatha
Mallika
Prabha
Vimala
Kamala
Shwetha
Sarala
Ramani
Bharathi
Anuradha

Soundtrack
The music was composed by Satyam.

References

1983 films
1980s Kannada-language films
Films scored by Satyam (composer)
Films directed by H. R. Bhargava